Jack Simpson (1 December 1920 – 13 January 1997) was a Northern Irish first-class cricketer.

Simpson was born in Lisburn  and was educated in the town at Wallace High School and Lisburn Technical College. Playing his club cricket for Lisburn, Simpson made a single appearance in first-class cricket for Ireland against Scotland at Paisley in 1954. He batted once in the match, scoring 26 runs in Ireland's first-innings, before being dismissed by Jimmy Allan. He also bowled fifteen wicket-less overs across Scotland's two innings. He died at Lisburn in January 1997.

References

External links

1920 births
1997 deaths
Sportspeople from Lisburn
People educated at Wallace High School, Lisburn
Cricketers from Northern Ireland
Irish cricketers
Lisburn Cricket Club players